Diaphera cumingiana is a species of air-breathing land snail, a terrestrial pulmonate gastropod mollusk in the family Diapheridae.

Diaphera cumingiana is the type species of the genus Diaphera.

The specific name cumingiana is in honor of the English naturalist Hugh Cuming.

Distribution 
The type locality of Diaphera cumingiana is the Philippines.

References

External links 

Diapheridae
Gastropods described in 1845